Tremethick Cross (from ) is a hamlet around a crossroads in the parish of Madron, in west Cornwall, United Kingdom. Between 1863 and 1884, the  A3071 road, was a turnpike serving the mining industry at St Just for the transport of ore to the nearest harbour in Penzance. A toll house, two miles west of Penzance, can still be seen on the crossroads.

Tremethick, Tremathick or Trereife cross is a stone Latin cross which was brought to this site from Rose-an-Beagle in the parish of Paul.

References

External links

Hamlets in Cornwall
Penwith